The Olympic Oath (distinct from the Olympic creed) is a solemn promise made by one athlete, judge or official, and one coach at the Opening Ceremony of each Olympic Games. Each oath taker is from the host nation and takes the oath on behalf of all athletes, officials, or coaches at the Games. The athletes' oath was first introduced for the 1920 Summer Olympic Games, with oaths for the officials and coaches added in 1972 and 2010. The oath is usually said in the language of the nation which is hosting the games; however, in 1994 both the athletes' and officials' oaths were said in English. Until the 1984 games the oath takers swore upon their nation's flag; since then all have taken the oath whilst holding the Olympic Flag. All three of the oaths were combined into one beginning at the 2018 Winter Games.

The inspiration for an oath came from the Ancient Olympic Games where competitors swore on a statue of Zeus. An oath for the athletes was first thought of in 1906, following unsportsmanlike incidents. An athletes' oath was introduced for the 1920 games and Victor Boin was the first person to take the oath on behalf of all athletes. Giuliana Minuzzo was the first woman to take the athletes' oath at the winter games in 1956, while Heidi Schuller did likewise at the Summer Olympics in 1972. The first Olympic Champion to take the oath was Rudolf Ismayr, who took it at the 1936 Games. The only occasion where more than one person has said an oath occurred at the 1988 Summer Olympics when Hur Jae and Shon Mi-Na took the athletes' oath together, until 2021 when rules around gender equality decreed that each oath would be taken by a man and a woman. The oath has changed over the years to remove nationalism and to reflect drugs in sport and equality.

An oath for the officials was first discussed in the 1950s. It was not, however, until 1970 that the International Olympic Committee (IOC) voted to include an oath of the officials as well as athletes at the Olympic Games. The first oath for the officials was taken by Fumio Asaki at the 1972 Winter Olympic Games. When the Youth Olympics were created the IOC decided to have an oath for coaches as they realised that young athletes look to them particularly. This was introduced into the adult games for the 2012 edition.

History
An oath was an idea taken from the Ancient Olympic Games where competitors swore an oath beside a statue of Zeus. A call for an oath was announced as early as 1906 by International Olympic Committee (IOC) president and founder Pierre de Coubertin in the Revue Olympique (Olympic Review in French). This was done in an effort to ensure fairness and impartiality. 
The Olympic Oath was first taken at the 1920 Summer Olympics in Antwerp by the fencer Victor Boin. 
Boin's oath in 1920 was:

We swear. We will take part in the Olympic Games in a spirit of chivalry, for the honour of our country and for the glory of sport.

At a winter sports week in Chamonix in 1924, which were retrospectively call the Olympic Games in 1926, all the competitors took an Olympic style oath and were led by Camille Mandrillon. Rudolf Ismayr was the first Olympic Champion to take the oath, doing so at the 1936 Games in Berlin. In 1956 Giuliana Chenal-Minuzzo became the first woman to recite the oath.

In 1961, "swear" was replaced by "promise" and "the honour of our countries" by "the honour of our teams" in an effort to eliminate nationalism at the Olympic Games. Therefore the oath was as follows:

In the name of all competitors, I promise that we shall take part in these Olympic Games, respecting and abiding by the rules that govern them, in the true spirit of sportsmanship, for the glory of sport and the honour of our teams.

An oath for the officials had been discussed since the 1950s when the International Amateur Boxing Association asked all its officials to undertake an oath. In 1970 the IOC amended rule 57 of the charter and decreed that a judge from the host nation would also take an oath. The first judges' oath was taken at the 1972 Winter Olympics in Sapporo by Fumio Asaki and Heinz Pollay performed the task at that year's summer games in Munich.

The Munich games saw Heidi Schüller become the first female athlete to take the oath at the Summer Games; women had been competing at the games since 1900. At the 1988 Games the athletes' oath for the first time was undertaken by more than one person, when Hur Jae and Shon Mi-Na took the oath in unison.

All persons up until the 1980 Games swore the oath on their country's flag. However, in an attempt to eliminate nationalism from the oath ceremony, all have sworn on the Olympic Flag since the 1984 games. The oaths are usually spoken in the language of the host nation (or athlete's mother tongue – Bojan Krizaj represented Yugoslavia but spoke Slovenian), but in 1994 both of the oaths were conducted in English rather than Norwegian.

In 1999, the IOC created the World Anti-Doping Agency (WADA) in an effort to form a more organized battle against doping.  Thus, the Athletes Oath was amended to include references to doping and drugs. In 2010 the IOC recognised that younger athletes, in particular, are influenced by their coaches. At the first Youth Olympic Games, coaches were also required to undertake an oath for this reason. With effect from the 2018 Winter Olympics, the three oaths were combined into one, led by an athlete, although representatives of judges and coaches are still involved in the taking of the oath. In July 2021 the oath was further refined to highlight inclusion and equality. The changes to the wording came from the IOC Athletes’ Commission. In addition the number of oath takers at each games were expanded from three to six, to ensure a member of each gender was represented in each oath as part of a commitment to promote women in sport at all levels and in all structures, as stated in the Olympic Charter.

Athletes' Oath
The chosen athlete, a representative of all the participating Olympic competitors, recited the following from 2000 until 2016:In the name of all competitors, I promise that we shall take part in these Olympic Games, respecting and abiding by the rules which govern them, committing ourselves to a sport without doping and without drugs, in the true spirit of sportsmanship, for the glory of sport and the honor of our teams.

The Officials' Oath
The judge/official, also from the host nation, likewise held a corner of the flag and said the following:

In the name of all the judges and officials, I promise that we shall officiate in these Olympic Games with complete impartiality, respecting and abiding by the rules which govern them, in the true spirit of sportsmanship.

The Coaches' Oath
At the 2010 Summer Youth Olympics, an additional oath was taken by a coach; this was added to the protocol for the 2012 Games:

In the name of all the coaches and other members of the athletes' entourage, I promise that we shall commit ourselves to ensuring that the spirit of sportsmanship and fair play is fully adhered to and upheld in accordance with the fundamental principles of Olympism.

Unified Oath
Beginning in PyeongChang at the 2018 Winter Olympics, there was only one oath.

A representative for the athletes, judges, and coaches each recites the following lines respectively:
In the name of the athletes.
In the name of all judges.
In the name of all the coaches and officials.

The athletes' representative then completes the oath:
We promise to take part in these Olympic Games, respecting and abiding by the rules and in the spirit of fair play. We all commit ourselves to sport without doping and cheating. We do this, for the glory of sport, for the honour of our teams and in respect for the Fundamental Principles of Olympism.

Equality changes
In July 2021 the oath was updated to include elements around inclusion and equality. The oath from now on would be said by a man and a woman of each discipline.

The representatives for the athletes, judges, and coaches each recites the following lines respectively:
In the name of the athletes.
In the name of all judges.
In the name of all the coaches and officials.

The athletes' representative then completes the oath:
We promise to take part in these Olympic Games, respecting and abiding by the rules and in the spirit of fair play, inclusion and equality. Together we stand in solidarity and commit ourselves to sport without doping, without cheating, without any form of discrimination. We do this for the honour of our teams, in respect for the Fundamental Principles of Olympism, and to make the world a better place through sport.

Speakers 

The athletes, judges and coaches that have delivered the Olympic Oath are listed below.

See also
 Olympic symbols

References

External links
Recording of the Olympic Oaths being taken in 2012

Oath
Oaths